Ntabeni Dukisa (born 25 July 1988) is a professional South African rugby union player for Kenyan side Kabras Sugar. His can play as a fly-half, fullback or wing.

Career

Youth

Border Bulldogs

He started eight of their ten matches during the 2011 Currie Cup First Division competition, scoring five tries, eight conversions and sixteen penalties to end the season as the Bulldogs' top scorer with 89, the fifth highest overall in the competition.

He continued scoring at a similar rate during the 2012 Vodacom Cup competition, where he got 63 points in six matches, of which he started four. He started three of the side's matches during the 2012 Currie Cup First Division competition, scoring eight points.

Griffons

He made five appearances for them to help them reach the semi-finals of the competition.

Eastern Province Kings

He was initially named in the  wider training squad for the 2013 Super Rugby season, but was subsequently released to the Vodacom Cup squad.

He made a total of four starts and nine substitute appearances for the Kings during the competition, helping them reach the final, where they lost 53–30 to the Pumas. He scored a total of 44 points during the season.

He played a full season in the 2014 Vodacom Cup competition, featuring in all seven of their matches and finishing as the EP Kings' top scorer with 50 points. Despite initially moving to Wellington-based side  on loan prior to the 2014 Currie Cup qualification tournament, he returned to the Kings shortly after to be closer to his sick mother. In June 2014, he was selected on the bench for the  side to face  during a tour match during a 2014 incoming tour. He came on with 8 minutes to go in the match as the Kings suffered a 12–34 defeat. He played in the Premier League of the Currie Cup for the first time in 2014, starting three matches and appearing as a substitute on a further three occasions.

Griquas

He joined Kimberley-based side  prior to the 2015 season.

Representative rugby

Dukisa came on as a substitute just after half-time in the match in Kimberley and he scored a try a few minutes later as the Barbarians lost 26–54 to the touring side.

References

South African rugby union players
Living people
1988 births
Border Bulldogs players
Griffons (rugby union) players
Eastern Province Elephants players
Boland Cavaliers players
Rugby union fly-halves
Rugby union fullbacks
Southern Kings players
Griquas (rugby union) players